Cracker Jack is a snack consisting of caramel-coated popcorn and peanuts.

Cracker Jack or Crackerjack may also refer to:

Arts, entertainment, and media

Fictional characters
 Cracker Jack (Street Fighter), a character exclusive in Street Fighter EX fighting games
 Crackerjack, a superhero in the comic book Astro City

Films
 Crackerjack (1938 film), a British comedy crime film directed by Albert de Courville
 Crackerjack (1994 film), an adventure film starring Thomas Ian Griffith, Nastassja Kinski, Christopher Plummer
 Crackerjack 2, a 1997 action film starring Judge Reinhold
 Crackerjack (2002 film), an Australian comedy
 Crackerjack 3, a 2000 spy film starring Bo Svenson

Music
 The Crackerjacks (band), a popular 1960s Memphis garage rock group
 Arthur Smith & His Crackerjacks, the band on The Arthur Smith Show

Periodicals
 Crackjack, a magazine supplement with the Bristol Evening Post

Television
 Crackerjack Productions, an Australian independent television production company
 Crackerjack! (TV series), a British children's comedy television series, running from 1955 to 1984; revived in 2020

Other uses
 Cracker Jack, Pennsylvania, United States, an unincorporated community
 Crackerjack, roller derby competitor, founder of the Mad Rollin' Dolls
 Crackerjack, a nutcracker that uses a ratchet to crack the shell
 Crackerjacks, a nickname for the United States Navy enlisted dress uniforms